Big Lasse of Delsbo (Swedish: Lång-Lasse i Delsbo) is a 1949 Swedish historical drama film directed by Ivar Johansson and starring Sten Lindgren, Anna Lindahl and Ulla Andreasson. It was shot at the Centrumateljéerna Studios in Stockholm. The film's sets were designed by the art director P.A. Lundgren. It was inspired by real historical events in nineteenth century Sweden.

Synopsis
In Delsbo in the 1840s, the new preacher Lars Landgren (known to his parishioners as Big Lasse) tries to battle moral decline in the area after being called in by concerned locals.

Cast

 Sten Lindgren as 	Lars Landgren
 Anna Lindahl as 	Mrs. Matilda Landgren
 Ulla Andreasson as 	Margit Bryngel
 Peter Lindgren as 	Klas Hägglund
 Arthur Fischer as Tratt-Lasse Bryngel
 Nils Hultgren as 	Mickel Hansson
 Axel Högel as Tuvesson Sr.
 Eric Laurent as Näslund
 Wilma Malmlöf as Lotta Bryngel 
 Erik Sundqvist as Björn Tuvesson
 Margit Andelius as 	Mrs. Näslund
 Torgny Anderberg as 	Halvar i Bakmossen
 Marianne Anderberg as 	Hästskojar-Nisse's wife
 Per-Axel Arosenius as 	Ekstedt
 Josua Bengtson as 	Tjyv-Pelle
 Greta Berthels as 	Brännar-Antes käring
 Astrid Bodin as 	Klas Hägglund's mother
 Helga Brofeldt as Björn's Mother
 Julia Cæsar as 	Bickering woman 
 John Ekman as 	Brännar-Ante
 Sture Ericson as 	Friend of Tratt-Lasse 
 Albin Erlandzon as 	Skinnar-Jonte
 Tyra Fischer as Skinnar-Jonte's wife
 Siegfried Fischer as 	Per Olsson i Överälven
 Ivar Hallbäck as Erik Jansson, priest
 Gustaf Hiort af Ornäs as 	Unmarried man interrogated by Landgren
 Lissi Alandh as 	Unmarried woman interrogated by Landgren 
 Adèle Lundvall as Johanna
 Erik Molin as 	Hästskojar-Nisse 
 Bellan Roos as Bickering woman's niece
 Edla Rothgardt as 	Woman at Skinnar-Jonte
 Nina Scenna as Immoral woman
 Hanny Schedin as 	Malena i Rismyra 
 Georg Skarstedt as 	Kjellstedt, school inspector
 Erik Sundquist as 	Visitor to Landgren 
 Ivar Wahlgren as 	Doctor
 Maud Walter as 	Woman
 Tom Walter as 	Olle Pryl
 Birger Åsander as 	Pelle Borst
 Alf Östlund as 	Hägglund Sr.
 Emmy Albiin as 	Petter's Wife
 Erik Forslund as 	Petter i Lilltorp

References

Bibliography 
 Qvist, Per Olov & von Bagh, Peter. Guide to the Cinema of Sweden and Finland. Greenwood Publishing Group, 2000.
 Wright, Rochelle. The Visible Wall: Jews and Other Ethnic Outsiders in Swedish Film. SIU Press, 1998.

External links 
 

1949 films
1944 drama films
1940s Swedish-language films
Films directed by Ivar Johansson
Swedish black-and-white films
Swedish historical drama films
1940s historical drama films
Films set in the 1840s
Films set in Sweden
1940s Swedish films